The Great Big British Quiz (TGBBQ), which ceased operating on 4 May 2007 was an interactive quiz based channel on which viewers where invited to phone in to solve puzzles in return for cash and prizes. It broadcast from studios in Battersea, London, England, and it was usually seen on Sky Digital. Its mascot was a dog called Jack who barked each time a caller was selected and put through to the studio. TGBBQ was live every day and broadcast hours varied, from 09:00 to 01:00 in its heyday to 20:00 until 04:00 as the quiz TV boom came to an end. The channel at one time produced and presented shows for Five and Sci Fi Channel.The show was seen on channel 840 on Sky Digital and channel 770 on NTL. In May 2007. TGBBQ ended due to Play To Win TV entering liquidation. In 2016 its rights were owned by ZeptoLab.

Presenters
Russ Spencer
Dan Warren
Derek Gibbons
Lisa-Marie Long
Carole Machin
Anna Fowler
Alex Kramer
Sara Damergi
Pollyanna Woodward
Sharon Clancy
Yiolanda Koppel
Lesley Collier
Zoe French
Rebecca Walsh
Carryl Varley
Liam Dolan
Ronan McKenna
Abi Griffiths
Abby Surgeon
Tim Fornana
Bev French 
Sarah Hendy
Ashley House

Sci-Fi Quiz Zone
The Sci-Fi Quiz Zone was a separate programme but still went under the name of The Great Big British Quiz, being referred to as TGBBQ's production. It was based in the same studio as The Great Big British Quiz but used different effects and games. The music was the same and there was still Jack the dog as the mascot. It was broadcast at different times, usually starting between 12.50am and 1.40am, and always ending at 4.00am, on the same channel as TGBBQ as well as the Sci-Fi Channel. It does not air on Saturday mornings. (Friday nights). Zeptolab also owns the right to the programme.

References

Quiz channels in the United Kingdom
Television channels and stations established in 2005
Defunct television channels in the United Kingdom
Phone-in quiz shows